A pizza layout is a model railway laid out as a circle of the smallest workable radius of curve, on the smallest possible square or circular baseboard. This baseboard can be so small as to look as if it would fit into a pizza box, hence the name.

Pizza layouts are not serious scale models, but are to provide a little humour. Despite their simplicity, they are rarely built by beginners but are usually light relief for an experienced modeller. As they are quick to build and lower budget they are often used as a theme for exhibitions and contests. Many are also seasonally themed, such as Christmas layouts. They often provide an opportunity to experiment with a different gauge and scale from a modeller's regular.

Building this minimum-size layout requires a small gauge. Most pizzas use 9mm gauge, as for N gauge. Z gauge and the esoteric smaller gauges would be useful too, but their costs are more than 9mm and there are fewer options available. Other gauges up to the popular H0/OO 16.5mm gauge are also used, but almost only as narrow gauge models.

Most pizzas model narrow gauge railways. This combines the narrow physical gauge needed with a larger and more visible scale. Narrow gauge prototypes also have short wheelbases, slow running speeds and so are often more accepting of tight curve radii. Where standard gauge is modelled, this is only for N, Z or smaller gauges, H0 requiring a size greater than the usual 'pizza' format, although this can just be achieved in 2' diameter.

Some model companies, such as Tomix, even produce extra-small radius curves of 4" radius, for modelling trams. These have been used to model at N gauge within a 9" baseboard.

Gn15 gauge models one of the smallest prototypical gauges, 15 inch minimum gauge railways. This gives the greatest combination of small curve radius and largest scale.

Nn3 Z gauge    Z gauge has even been used to make layouts inside a large glass bottle.

The layout is a simple circular loop. Points are limited to just one, perhaps two, small sidings and these are more decorative than useful for shunting. A siding to the outside of the loop requires a larger baseboard. A siding inside the loop may do so too: the siding's radius must be smaller than that of the running loop, which is already close to the minimum radius. Allowing the loop to be a little larger, so as to permit a tighter siding curve within it, means a larger loop and baseboard. This can be done most compactly by stretching the circular loop to an oval, but keeping the same radius with an added straight; the point comes off the straight portion. In rare cases, a fiddle yard has been incorporated into a hidden part of the layout.

Although rare, some pizza layouts have also used multi-level spiral layouts, with something of the rabbit warren to them.

Scenery 
Scenery may be realistic, a caricature of geography containing real buildings or deliberately unrealistic. The difficulty is the likelihood that all of the layout can be seen at once, and the problem of finding any sort of visual break between the two sides. Many simply ignore this, placing a realistic building or feature in the centre and ignoring the logical pointlessness of a railway that obviously circles without going anywhere. Some  layouts model funfairs, where the short circle can appear purposeful. A popular approach is to place a large visual break in the centre of the layout, such as a hill or quarry working. This has the advantage of stopping the layout look so obviously a loop, but at the risk of looking like a wedding cake with an arbitrary hill in the middle. Many alpine or mining layouts have hidden half of the loop beneath tunnels.

See also 
 Rabbit warren layout, another small humorous layout design based on a continual running loop.
 Suitcase layout, tiny layouts, usually Z gauge, which fold into a portable case.

References 

Model railroads
Narrow gauge railway modelling